Para or Para Naga (autonym: Jejara; also called Bara, Parasar), is an unclassified Naga language of India and Burma. It is not close to other Naga languages which it has been compared to, though Para Naga, Long Phuri Naga, and Makuri Naga may be closest to each other, with Para the most distinct. Barkman (2014) notes that Para Naga could possibly be an Ao or Tangkhulic language. Saul (2005) classifies Para Naga as an Ao language. Hsiu (2021) classifies Para as a sister of the Central Naga (Ao) languages.

Para is spoken in 7 villages of Leshi Township, Hkamti District, Sagaing Region, Myanmar.

References 

Barkman, Tiffany. 2014. A descriptive grammar of Jejara (Para Naga). MA thesis, Chiang Mai: Payap University.
Saul, J. D. 2005. The Naga of Burma: Their festivals, customs and way of life. Bangkok, Thailand: Orchid Press.

Languages of Myanmar
Kuki-Chin–Naga languages